Frank R. Milliken was an American businessperson.

Early life and education
Milliken was born on January 25, 1914, in Malden, Massachusetts. He received a degree in mining engineering from the Massachusetts Institute of Technology in 1934.

Career
Milliken presided over Kennecott, based in New York City during the nationalization of the company's Chilean mines and stricter environmental regulations. In 1977, during his tenure, Kennecott acquired Carborundum.

In 1975, Miliken became a member of the National Academy of Engineering. He took retirement in 1979. He died on December 4, 1991.

References

1914 births
1991 deaths
American businesspeople